Ovindoli is a village and comune of the province of L'Aquila in the Abruzzo region of central Italy. Close to Rome, it is a  resort for both summer and winter sports, including hiking, biking, equestrian activities and downhill and cross-country skiing.

Geography
Ovindoli lies in the Apennine Mountains of Abruzzo, within the regional park of Sirente-Velino.

History
Ovindoli became known  a popular destination for downhill skiing following World War I, but it was not until 1959 that the mountain organized as a modern ski resort; at the time, it was called Valturvema. During the 1961–62 season, ski lifts began  operating and the trails were expanded. Charles Rogers, an American working at that time in the US Embassy in Rome, served as President of the Society that worked to further develop the area as a ski resort and oversaw  expansion activities. In 1994, the ski resort changed management and was named Monte Magnola and modernized with new trails, ski lifts and snow making capabilities.

Twin towns
The town has been twinned with the following towns:
  Tarxien , Malta

References

Cities and towns in Abruzzo
Marsica